DWIZ (882 AM) is a radio station owned and operated by Aliw Broadcasting Corporation, a subsidiary of the ALC Group of Companies, and serves as the flagship station of the DWIZ network. The station's studio is located at the 5th Floor, Citystate Centre, 709 Shaw Boulevard, Brgy. Oranbo, Pasig, and its transmitter is located at Osmeña St., Brgy. Pag-Asa, Obando, Bulacan.

History

1949-1991: Early beginnings as DZPI, the first iteration of DWIZ
It was then known as DZPI from 1949 to 1972, broadcasting at 800 kHz until November 1978 when it transferred to 882 kHz due to the adoption of the 9 kHz spacing for medium wave stations as stipulated by the Geneva Frequency Plan of 1975 (aka GE75) supplanting the NARBA-mandated 10 kHz spacing rule.

DWIZ officially began its broadcast operations on September 24, 1972 as DWIZ Sunshine City under the ownership of Manila Broadcasting Company through its subsidiary, Philippine Broadcasting Corporation. As one of the stations established during the Martial Law, it was then one of the most influential Top 40 music stations in Metro Manila. In 1986, it shifted to a full service format with emphasis on news and music. DWIZ Sunshine City signed off for the last time on the first quarter of 1991.

1991-present: The current iteration of DWIZ
In 1991, Aliw Broadcasting Corporation, a then-newly established broadcast network owned by Antonio Cabangon Chua, acquired DWIZ. Relaunched in April that year as a news and talk station with its first station tagline, "Boses Pilipino, Radyo ng Tao", DWIZ pioneered the Broadcast Tandem System, wherein a pair of broadcasters on board man the station's newscasts. Leading the station's first years of broadcast are some of the anchors and reporters from DZRH; among them is Rey Langit, who served as its station manager from its first year until 2016, when he left the station. The first big news coverage on DWIZ was the country's annual Independence Day celebrations in 1991, followed immediately by the eruption of Mount Pinatubo. In 1994, the station increased its power from 25,000 watts to 50,000 watts. As one of the few stations in the market authorized to operate with such power, it carries the tagline Todong Lakas.

In 2000, DWIZ relocated their studio from Dominga Building, Pasong Tamo, Makati (home of Aliw's sister companies BusinessMirror and Pilipino Mirror) to their current home in Citystate Centre in Shaw Boulevard, Pasig.

In 2005, DWIZ launched Karambola, a morning political commentary program featuring a panel of journalists and columnists led by Jonathan De la Cruz. Karambola is now one of the station's longest-running programs.

On January 3, 2014, DWIZ signed a 3-year memorandum of agreement with Radio Philippines Network (owner of CNN Philippines-affiliated stations and Radyo Ronda) for the expanded coverage of both the TV and radio networks nationwide. Selected programs of this station are also simulcasted on the Radyo Ronda Network. DWIZ also launched its first ever radio jingle on July 14, 2014, a couple of days before Typhoon Glenda (Rammasun) wreaked havoc over Metro Manila.

In 2016, DWIZ officially upgraded its newly improved 50,000-watt transmitter system standing on a 300-foot tower, providing improved signal reception in the Greater Luzon Area.

On January 30, 2023, DWIZ underwent some programming changes to serve a wider audience. This comes along with the reformat of Home Radio provincial stations to a news and talk station under the DWIZ branding.

ALIW Channel 23

On May 6, 2022, DWIZ started its TeleRadyo feed on digital TV via Channel 23 (527.143 MHz). The channel was awarded by the National Telecommunications Commission to Aliw last January 5.

On August 10, 2022, the channel started carrying the brand IZTV, with the tagline The News Company. It officially launched on November 18 and rebranded as ALIW Channel 23 on January 30, 2023.

Recognitions
The year 2014 and 2015 served as milestone for the station as it received several recognitions:

 Best Radio Documentary (Siyasat: "Damo") 23rd KBP Golden Dove Awards 2015
 The "Most Outstanding Radio Station of the Year" awarded by the Rotary Club of Manila Journalism Awards,
 The "Best Magazine Program" awarded to "Siyasat" by the KBP Golden Dove Awards,
 Citation in the "Best AM Radio Station" category in the KBP Golden Dove Awards
 Best Station Radio Category by the Universal Peace Federation
 Gawad Ulat for Most Supportive Radio Station by the Department of Social Welfare and Development

Notable anchors

Current
 Trixie Cruz-Angeles
 Larry Gadon
 Evangeline Pascual
 Ferdinand Topacio

Past
 Arnold Clavio
 Sen. Imee Marcos
 Mocha Uson
 Dong Puno
 Ramon Tulfo
 Rey Langit
 Salvador Escudero
 Teodoro Locsin Jr.
 Jesus Crispin “Boying” Remulla
 Percy Lapid
 Alex Santos
 Gani Oro

References

External links

Aliw Broadcasting Corporation
DWIZ
News and talk radio stations in the Philippines
Radio stations established in 1949